The New Jersey Wildcats is an American women’s soccer team, founded by Vincent Baldino in 1996. The team was a member of the United Soccer Leagues W-League, the second tier of women’s soccer in the United States and Canada. The team played in the Northeast Division of the Eastern Conference against the D.C. United Women, New Jersey Rangers, Long Island Rough Riders, New York Magic and North Jersey Valkyries.

As of April 2018, the Wildcats have merged their teams with Princeton Soccer Association to create the PSA Wildcats. In addition to the merge, the Wildcats have joined the WPSL, playing in the East Region (Metropolitan Conference) alongside SUSA FC, New York Athletic Club, Rhode Island Rogues, and  Long Island Fury, as of the 2019 WPSL season.
The team currently plays its home games in the stadium at Woodbridge High School in Woodbridge, New Jersey. The club's colors are white and blue.

Players

2012 roster

Roster 2009

Year-by-year

Notable former players
The following former players have played at the professional and/or international level:
  Jenny Benson	
  Kimberly Brandão 	
  Lara Dickenmann  
  Formiga  	
  Kendall Fletcher  	
  Tobin Heath 	
  Christine Latham	
  Karina LeBlanc 	
  Carli Lloyd 	
  Anne Mäkinen 		
  Esmeralda Negron
  Heather O'Reilly
  Chanté Sandiford
  Kelly Smith 	
  Lindsay Tarpley 	
  Christie Welsh 	
  Cat Whitehill 
  Rachel Unitt 	
  Rachel Yankey
   Yoreli Rincón

Honors
 USL W-League Northeast Division Champions 2006
 USL W-League Champions 2005
 USL W-League Northeast Division Champions 2005
 USL W-League Northeast Division Champions 2004

Coaches
  Socrates Nicolaidis 2007–2008
Mike Barroqueiro 2008
Dave Barbour – Present

Stadiums
 Stadium at Robbinsville High School, Robbinsville, New Jersey 2008–present
 Stadium at Paul VI High School, Haddon Township, New Jersey 2008 (1 game)
 Stadium at Mercer County Community College, West Windsor, New Jersey 1999–2009
 Field 1 at Mercer County Park, West Windsor, New Jersey 1996–1998

References

External links 
 New Jersey Wildcats website
  New Jersey Wildcats on USL Soccer

   

 
Women's soccer clubs in the United States
Soccer clubs in New Jersey
Association football clubs established in 1996
USL W-League (1995–2015) teams
Sports in Trenton, New Jersey
1996 establishments in New Jersey